A warehouse store or warehouse supermarket is a food and grocery retailer that operates stores geared toward offering deeper discounted prices than a traditional supermarket. These stores offer a no-frills experience and warehouse shelving stocked well with merchandise intended to move at higher volumes. Unlike warehouse clubs, warehouse stores do not require a membership or membership fees. Warehouse stores can also offer a selection of merchandise sold in bulk. 
Typically, warehouse stores are laid out in a logical format; this leads customers in a certain way around the store to the checkout. For example, as one enters the store they are directed down an aisle of discounted products. From there the layout could then lead to the fresh produce department, followed by the deli and bakery departments at the back of the store. Often, certain customer service niceties, like the bagging of groceries, are not done by store employees; this helps reduce overall cost. Many warehouse stores are operated by traditional grocery chains both as a way to attract lower income, value conscious consumers and to maximize their buying power in order to lower costs at their mainstream stores.

Examples in the United States and Canada 
Traditional warehouse store chains include:
 Cub Foods, affiliated with SuperValu
 Food 4 Less, affiliated with Kroger (and Nugget Markets in Northern California/Oregon)
 Food Basics (Canada), affiliated with Metro Inc.
 Food Basics (United States), affiliated with A&P
 Food Maxx, affiliated with Save Mart
 Foods Co., affiliated with Kroger
 Food Source, affiliated with Raley's Supermarkets
 Superior Grocers, an independently owned southern California chain
 Super 1 Foods, based in east Texas, Arkansas and Louisiana; owned by Brookshire Grocery Company
 Super 1 Foods, based in Idaho, Montana, and Washington, owned by Rosauers Supermarkets
 Super One Foods, a small chain based in Duluth, Minnesota
 Super Saver Foods, affiliated with Albertsons
 Warehouse Economy Outlet (WEO), affiliated with A&P, now defunct
 Smart & Final (SFS), Owned by Ares Management, recently began trading publicly
 Warehouse Markets a small Tulsa OK based chain
 WinCo Foods (includes one Waremart store in Oregon)

Other types of warehouse store chains include: 
Aldi. Aldi Stores are smaller specialty stores that largely feature only their own in house private labels.
 Woodman's Markets. Focuses on carrying a much large variety of brands and product offerings than traditional supermarkets at lower prices.

See also 
 Types of retail outlets

References 

Retail formats
Warehouses